This is a list of historic counties of England by area as at the 1871 census. Note that Monmouthshire was considered to be part of England at the time.

References

Area in 1871
1871 in England